People's Century is a television documentary series examining the 20th century. It was a joint production of the BBC in the United Kingdom and PBS member station WGBH Boston in the United States. The series was first shown on BBC in the 1995, 1996 and 1997 television seasons before being broadcast in the US and elsewhere in the world in 1998.

Premise

The 26 one-hour episodes examined the socio-economic, political, and cultural movements that shaped the 20th century.
The series represented a departure from documentaries that present history through recounting the actions of great men; People's Century considers the century from the perspective of common people.  Most of those interviewed were ordinary men and women who closely witnessed various events and who give personal accounts of the manner in which the developments and disruptions of the 20th century affected their lives.

The British version was narrated by Sean Barrett and Veronika Hyks, the American version by actors John Forsythe and Alfre Woodard.   People's Century was co-produced by the BBC and WGBH with executive producers Peter Pagnamenta and Zvi Dor-Ner, respectively, along with producer David Espar.

The opening credits depict various images from the century, accompanied with a theme music score by Zbigniew Preisner.  The documentary won an International Emmy Award, among others.

International versions
People's Century was broadcast in several non-English-speaking countries, including Norway (with subtitles, as is normal on Norwegian television). In Germany, the series was dubbed, under its English title, on VOX as a weekly feature on a 4-to-6h slot called DCTP Nachtclub with several episodes in each slot, as part of the channel's Spiegel TV documentaries programme co-operation with Der Spiegel. A Swiss-produced VHS set was released of the German-dubbed version under the title Chronik des 20. Jahrhunderts. The German dub also ran on Austrian and Swiss television.

Interviewees
 List of People's Century interviewees

The series

Season 1 (1995)

Season 2 (1996)

Season 3 (1997)

VHS and DVD editions
In 1997 and 1998, VHS box sets were produced in PAL and NTSC. By 2007, most original episodes remained unavailable on DVD, however in late 2006 DVD editions were released in the US of the two world-war episodes Killing Fields and Total War exclusively in NTSC, with a few cut-down post-war episodes (on a DVD called Young Blood, drawing from the previously released Baby Boomers Boxed Set on VHS that had contained 5 complete episodes), by WGBH Boston.

References

External links
People's Century at WGBH-TV
about People's Century (PBS-WGBH)
 
 

1995 British television series debuts
1997 British television series endings
1990s British documentary television series
English-language television shows
Historical television series
PBS original programming
Peabody Award-winning television programs
BBC television documentaries about history during the 20th Century